County Road 917, also known as Grimstadveien (Grimstad Road), is a  road in the municipality of Bø in Nordland County, Norway.

The road starts at the village of Eidet, where it branches off from County Road 915. It travels north, parallel to the coast, past the Klubben and Bøne farms, before terminating at the Grimstad farm. The road was widened and paved in 2014.

References

External links
Statens vegvesen – trafikkmeldinger Fv917 (Traffic Information: County Road 917)

917
Bø, Nordland